Sandy Kendall is an American rower. In the 1986 and 1987 World Rowing Championships, she won gold in the women's lightweight coxless four event (see rosters below). The crews were coached by Andy Anderson, who coached the U.S. lightweight coxless four from 1985 through 1988 (and again in the mid 1990s). Kendall was coached by Gordon Hamilton in the 1984 World Championships (LW4- with C.B. Sands, Kristen Fowks, and Grace Hodges), as well as in the 1989 World University Games (LW2- bronze with [./Chttps://en.wikipedia.org/wiki/Carin_Reynoldsarin Reynolds Carin Reynolds]) and the 1990 Goodwill Games (LW2- with Charlotte Hollings). She was inducted into the National Rowing Hall of Fame in 1997.

References

American female rowers
World Rowing Championships medalists for the United States
Year of birth missing (living people)
Living people
21st-century American women